Cornwall County Council was the county council of the non-metropolitan county of Cornwall in south west England. It came into its powers on 1 April 1889 and was abolished on 1 April 2009.

History
Cornwall County Council was formed on 1 April 1889. From 1974 the county had six districts: Caradon, Carrick, Kerrier, North Cornwall, Penwith and Restormel (a borough). The Council had its headquarters at Old County Hall in Station Road, Truro until it moved to New County Hall at Treyew Road, also in Truro, in 1966. The County Council and the District Councils were replaced with one unitary authority known as Cornwall Council on 1 April 2009.

Party control
The following table shows party control of the Cornwall County Council, following each election since 1973 until its abolition in 2009:

Notable members
Joseph Trewavas VC (1835–1905)
Sir Edward Bolitho, Chairman 1941 to 1952
Sir John Carew Pole, 12th Baronet, Chairman 1952 to 1963.

See also

Cornwall Council elections

References

Former county councils of England
1889 establishments in England
2009 disestablishments in England
County Council